is a 1938 Japanese two-part silent period piece drama film set during the Edo period and produced by Zenshō Cinema. It is now considered to be a lost film.

Plot
One night, Chinami (Reiko Mishima), the daughter of Hyoue Toba (Reizaburo Ichikawa), is mysteriously kidnapped. Hyoue offers a large reward for his daughter's rescue. Yuzuru Kawasaki (Noboru Takashima) and various other men employed by Hyoue set about searching for Chinami. However one of Hyoue's men, Magonojyō Gō (Eizaburo Matsumoto), does not partake in the search, because he was the one who had Chinami kidnapped. Magonojyō's father Senbei has a trained pet ape named "King Kong" (Ryūnosuke Kabayama) and Magonojyō used this creature to perform the kidnapping.  
Magonojyō has a score to settle with Hyoue because he had forced Senbei to counterfeit coins. When Senbei refused to do so, he was imprisoned by Hyoue and eventually killed. This is why Magonojyō disguised his identity and went to work for Hyoue, to get close to him in order to get revenge.
Magonojyō eventually corners Hyoue and threatens him with the ape. He offers to give him the whereabouts of Chinami in exchange for the reward money. The ape then takes Hyoue to Magonojyō's secret cellar as a prisoner. The ape then goes berserk and kills Hyoue but is then fatally wounded by Hyoue's men. While all this is happening, Magonojyō leaves Edo with the reward money.

Cast 

  as Anthropoid
Eizaburo Matsumoto as Magonojo Go
 Reizaburo Ichikawa as Hyoe Toba
 Reiko Mishima as Chinami

Production
The film was broken into two parts. The first part called Edo ni Arawareta Kingu Kongu: Henge no Maki / 江戸に現れたキングコング:変化の巻 (The King Kong That Appeared in Edo: The Episode of the Monster) was released on March 31, 1938, while the second part called Edo ni Arawareta Kingu Kongu: Ōgon no Maki / 江戸に現れたキングコング:黄金の巻 (The King Kong That Appeared in Edo: The Episode of Gold) was released a week later on April 7, 1938. Both films ran 5 reels in length and premiered at the Yûrakukan theater in Asakusa, Tokyo.

Going by the plot synopsis as well as flyers promoting the film, it is believed by historians that the ape (looking more like a yeti) is only referred to as "King Kong" in name only and does not appear gigantic outside of promotional photos. These photos that appear on the films flyers and advertisements, depict him being so big that he is holding Chinami in the palm of his hand and is straddling buildings as he faces down Hyoue Toba's men. This, along with the fact that Zensho was a typical Poverty Row studio who did not have sound recording equipment (none of the 173 films they produced between 1936 and 1941 were talkies), leads to believe that Zensho was simply trying to capitalize on King Kong's 1938 re-issue in that country by promoting the ape as being a giant.

However "King Kong" suit creator and actor Ryūnosuke Kabayama (who later changed his name to  )and later created the ape creature seen in the 1956 film 水戸黄門漫遊記 人喰い狒々(Mito Kōmon Manyūki: Hitokui Hihi), as well as the suit for Godzilla in the original 1954 film) stated in a 1988 interview "The first model making to be counted as 'special art direction' in Japanese cinema was a giant gorilla which I did for the movie The King Kong That Appeared in Edo fifty years ago. It was also the first movie to feature certain kinds of special effects." With this statement from the suits creator there seems to be some contradiction over the actual size of the title character.

See also
Wasei Kingu Kongu
List of lost films

Notes

References

External links

King Kong, Japanese Movie Database entry (in Japanese). Babelfish translation

Films set in Edo
1938 films
1930s fantasy films
1930s monster movies
1938 lost films
Japanese black-and-white films
1930s Japanese-language films
Kaiju films
Lost Japanese films
King Kong (franchise) films
Japanese fantasy films
Lost fantasy films